TV3 Mentor is a music reality show organized by TV3. The reality show was the first reality show concerning music organized in Ghana.

Awards

References 

Ghanaian television shows
Ghanaian music
TV3 Ghana original programming